Landon Trent Forrest (born June 12, 1998) is an American professional basketball player for the Atlanta Hawks of the National Basketball Association (NBA) on a two-way contract with the College Park Skyhawks of the NBA G League. He played college basketball for the Florida State Seminoles. Listed at 6 ft 4 in (1.93 m) and 210 lb (95 kg), he plays the point guard and shooting guard positions.

Early life and high school career
Forrest grew up in Chipley, Florida and attended Chipley High School. During his high school career, Forrest scored over 3,000 points. As a senior, he led Chipley to a state championship, scoring 26 points in the title game against Paxton High School. Forrest also participated in Amateur Athletic Union competition with the Alabama Challenge and Georgia Stars. He was ranked in the top 50 of his high school class. Forrest signed with Florida State because he fell in love with the vision of coach Leonard Hamilton. Forrest turned down offers from Miami (Florida), Georgia Tech, Tennessee, UCF and Wichita State.

College career
Forrest averaged 4.9 points, 2.7 rebounds, 1.6 assists, and 1.2 steals per game as a freshman, playing backup point guard to Xavier Rathan-Mayes. As a sophomore, Forrest finished fifth on the team in scoring with 7.9 points per game and third in rebounding with 4.9 per game, helping Florida State reach the Elite Eight. During a game against Villanova on November 25, 2018, Forrest had the cartilage torn completely off the bone in his big toe, yet played through pain and did not miss a single game. During the 2019 NCAA Tournament, Forrest scored 20 points and had five rebounds in the Sweet 16 loss to Gonzaga and was named to the West Regional All-Tournament Team. As a junior, Forrest averaged 9.3 points, 4.5 rebounds, and 3.7 assists per game. He graduated from Florida State in December 2019 with a degree in sports management, and he earned the Skip Prosser Award for best scholar-athlete in the ACC since he carried a 3.43 GPA. At the conclusion of the regular season, Forrest was selected to the Second Team All-ACC and to the Defensive Team. He averaged 11.6 points, 4.4 rebounds and 4.0 assists per game as a senior.

Professional career

Utah Jazz (2020–2022)
After going undrafted in the 2020 NBA draft, Forrest signed a two-way contract with the Utah Jazz. He would split time between the Jazz and their NBA G League affiliate, the Salt Lake City Stars.

On August 11, 2021, Forrest signed a second two-way contract and on April 10, 2022, his deal was converted into a standard NBA contract.

Atlanta Hawks (2022–present)
On August 8, 2022, Forrest signed a two-way contract with the Atlanta Hawks.

Career statistics

NBA

Regular season

|-
| style="text-align:left;"| 
| style="text-align:left;"| Utah
| 30 || 0 || 10.1 || .451 || .192 || 1.000 || 1.5 || 1.5 || .3 || .1 || 2.9
|-
| style="text-align:left;"| 
| style="text-align:left;"| Utah
| 60 || 6 || 12.8 || .490 || .185 || .792 || 1.7 || 1.8 || .5 || .1 || 3.3
|- class="sortbottom"
| style="text-align:center;" colspan="2"| Career
| 90 || 6 || 11.9 || .478 || .189 || .851 || 1.6 || 1.7 || .4 || .1 || 3.1

Playoffs

|-
| style="text-align:left;"| 2021
| style="text-align:left;"| Utah
| 4 || 0 || 2.5 || .500 || — || — || .0 || .0 || .0 || .0 || 1.0
|- class="sortbottom"
| style="text-align:center;" colspan="2"| Career
| 4 || 0 || 2.5 || .500 || — || — || .0 || .0 || .0 || .0 || 1.0

College

|-
| style="text-align:left;"| 2016–17
| style="text-align:left;"| Florida State
| 35 || 0 || 15.4 || .473 || .125 || .676 || 2.7 || 1.6 || 1.2 || .1 || 4.9
|-
| style="text-align:left;"| 2017–18
| style="text-align:left;"| Florida State
| 34 || 2 || 25.6 || .492 || .214 || .697 || 4.9 || 4.1 || 1.6 || .4 || 7.9
|-
| style="text-align:left;"| 2018–19
| style="text-align:left;"| Florida State
| 37 || 36 || 29.9 || .439 || .233 || .779 || 4.5 || 3.7 || 1.9 || .2 || 9.3
|-
| style="text-align:left;"| 2019–20
| style="text-align:left;"| Florida State
| 31 || 31 || 30.9 || .459 || .281 || .822 || 4.4 || 4.0 || 1.9 || .6 || 11.6
|- class="sortbottom"
| style="text-align:center;" colspan="2"| Career
| 137 || 69 || 25.4 || .462 || .248 || .748 || 4.1 || 3.3 || 1.6 || .3 || 8.3

Personal life
Both his mother, Barbara Lee, and his father, Lester Forrest played basketball at Chipola Junior College. His mother is the pastor of the All Things New Worship Center and Forrest played drums in the church. His father is the manager of Gilmore Park for Chipley's recreation department and built the youth basketball program in the town. Forrest has an older brother, Trey, who also played basketball.

References

External links
Florida State Seminoles bio

1998 births
Living people
American men's basketball players
Atlanta Hawks players
Basketball players from Florida
Florida State Seminoles men's basketball players
People from Chipley, Florida
Point guards
Shooting guards
Undrafted National Basketball Association players
Utah Jazz players